Otto II, Count of Zutphen was a Dutch nobleman from the early 12th century. Otto was the son of Gottschalk, Count of Zutphen and Adelheid of Zutphen, daughter of Liudolf of Lotharingia, Liudolf himself was grandson of Emperor Otto II and Theophanu. In 1107 he received the Frisian domains of Westergo, Oostergo and Suthergo of Henry V, Holy Roman Emperor  in exchange for landed possessions around Alzey.

Otto's maternal grandfather may be Otto of Hammerstein, who may have been the first count of Zutphen. Alternatively Adelheid may be a daughter of Ludolf of Zutphen and Mathilda of Hammerstein (daughter of Otto of Hammerstein).

Otto, known as "the rich", married Judith of Arnstein. They had four children:
 Henry II, Count of Zutphen, Westergo, Oostergo and Suthergo (died before 1134) married  Mathilde of Beichlingen, daughter of Kuno, Count of Beichlingen and Kunigunde of Weimar.
 Dirk (Diederik) of Zutphen ( died before 1134).  Bishop of Munster.
 Gerard (died before 1134).
 Ermengarde of Zutphen married 1) Gerard II, Count of Guelders and 2) Conrad II, Count of Luxembourg, son of William I, Count of Luxembourg and Luitgard von Beichlingen. Ermengarde was Countess of Zutphen from 1122 to 1138.

References

Literature 
 Pieter Lodewijk Muller: Otto II., Graf von Zütphen. In: Allgemeine Deutsche Biographie (ADB). Band 24, Duncker & Humblot, Leipzig 1887, S. 741.

Counts of Zutphen
Year of birth missing
Year of death missing
12th-century people of the Holy Roman Empire